B. M. Allman was an American football and basketball coach.  He was the head football coach at Adrian College in Adrian, Michigan for two seasons, from 1921 to 1922, compiling a record of 5–2–1.  Allman was also the head basketball coach at Adrian from 1921 to 1923, tallying a mark of 8–14.

Head coaching record

Football

References

Year of birth missing
Year of death missing
Adrian Bulldogs football coaches
Adrian Bulldogs men's basketball coaches